The Railway Inn is a pub in Spofforth, North Yorkshire, England.

Description 
The Railway Inn is a typical English pub with both a public bar and a lounge. It serves one cask beer, Samuel Smiths Old Brewery Bitter, and some lagers, which are well kept in the cellar of the pub.

Historic photographs of the village are displayed on the interior walls of the pub.

No logos of the brewery are shown outside, as the brewery has adopted a policy of not displaying the brewery name on their pubs. In 2019 the brewery introduced rules banning the use of mobile telephones, tablets and laptops within the indoor area of their pubs with the aim of removing activities which discouraged conversation.

References

Pubs in North Yorkshire
Spofforth, North Yorkshire